Melete (minor planet designation: 56 Melete) is a large and dark main belt asteroid. It is a rather unusual P-type asteroid, probably composed of organic rich silicates, carbon and anhydrous silicates, with possible internal water ice. The asteroid orbits the Sun with a period of 4.18 years.

Melete was discovered by Hermann Goldschmidt from his balcony in Paris, on September 9, 1857. Its orbit was computed by E. Schubert, who named it after Melete, the Muse of meditation in Greek mythology. It was originally confused for 41 Daphne before it was confirmed not to be by its second sighting on August 27, 1871. In 1861, the brightness of 56 Melete was shown to vary by German astronomer Friedrich Tietjen.

Melete has been studied by radar. Photometric observations of this asteroid at the Palmer Divide Observatory in Colorado Springs, Colorado in 2007 gave a light curve with a period of 18.151 ± 0.002 hours and a brightness variation of 0.15 ± 0.02 in magnitude. This result is in agreement with a period of 18.1 hours independently reported in 1993 and 2007.

To date, two stellar occultations by Melete have been observed successfully (in 1997 and again in 2002).

References

External links 
 Lightcurve plot of 56 Melete, Palmer Divide Observatory, B. D. Warner (2007)
 Asteroid Lightcurve Database (LCDB), query form (info )
 Dictionary of Minor Planet Names, Google books
 Asteroids and comets rotation curves, CdR – Observatoire de Genève, Raoul Behrend
 Discovery Circumstances: Numbered Minor Planets (1)-(5000) – Minor Planet Center
 
 

000056
000056
000056
Discoveries by Hermann Goldschmidt
Named minor planets
18570909